Claudia Sangiorgi Dalimore is a filmmaker in Australia. She won an Australian Women in Music Award. She features women in her music videos. Her videos have been nominated for the ARIA Award for Best Video and J Award Music Video of the Year honor.

She directed Thelma Plum's "Better In Blak" music video. She and Plum were interviewed by Marie Claire.

In 2020 she directed a music video for Okenyo addressing white supremacy. Her music video for Nigerian-Australian musician PRICIE debuted in February 2021.

Awards and nominations

ARIA Music Awards
The ARIA Music Awards is an annual award ceremony event celebrating the Australian music industry. They commenced in 1987.

! 
|-
| 2018
| "Native Tongue" by Mojo Juju (directed by Claudia Sangiorgi Dalimore)
|rowspan="2" |  Best Video
| 
|rowspan="2" |   
|-
| 2019
| "Better in Blak" by Thelma Plum (directed by Claudia Sangiorgi Dalimore)
| 
|-

References

Australian filmmakers
Year of birth missing (living people)
Living people